Pyxicephalus (πυξίς, pyxis = "(round) box," κεφαλή, kephalē = "head") is a genus of true frogs from Sub-Saharan Africa, commonly referred to as African bull frogs or bull frogs. They are very large (P. adspersus) to large (remaining species) frogs, with females significantly smaller than males. They may take decades to reach their full size potential and they are some of the longest-living frogs, possibly able to reach ages as high as 45 years.

These bulky and voracious predators will eat any animal (including small vertebrates and conspecifics) they can fit in their large mouth that has two fang-like projections on the lower jaw, but they are themselves commonly eaten by humans, predatory birds, mammals and monitor lizards. They remain hidden—they are fossorial—for much of the year, but emerge to breed in temporary pools after rains. The tadpoles often are guarded by the male.

Species
There are four recognized species:

 Pyxicephalus adspersus Tschudi, 1838 – African bullfrog
 Pyxicephalus angusticeps Parry, 1982
 Pyxicephalus edulis Peters, 1854 – edible bullfrog
 Pyxicephalus obbianus Calabresi, 1927 – Calabresi's bullfrog

P. edulis has long been confused with P. adspersus, and species limits between them are not fully understood. Additionally, P. angusticeps was only revalidated in 2013, and some authorities still do not recognize it. Another sometimes used name is P. cordofanus Steindachner, 1867, but it is a nomen dubium.

References

 
Pyxicephalidae
Amphibians of Sub-Saharan Africa
Amphibian genera
Taxa named by Johann Jakob von Tschudi